Christian Bauman (born June 15, 1970) is an American novelist, essayist, and lyricist.

Early life and education
Bauman was born in Easton, Pennsylvania on June 15, 1970. He began grade school while living in Doylestown, Pennsylvania, and moved to the Quakertown section of Franklin Township, New Jersey when he was in the fourth grade. He remained there until he left home at age 17. He graduated from North Hunterdon High School near Clinton, New Jersey in 1988 and did not attend college. 

Bauman's family traveled a great deal around North America and Europe when he was a child. The family spent a year in India, Nepal, and Sri Lanka in 1983–84, when Bauman would have been in 8th grade. Bauman was raised by his stepfather (a philosophy professor) and mother (a physician); his biological father was only an occasional presence in his life and spent a year in prison when Bauman was a child. In a 2003 interview with Terry Gross on NPR's Fresh Air, Bauman said his childhood was not a particularly happy one.

Career
A former soldier, Bauman authored the 2002 novel The Ice Beneath You about the return of a young American soldier from Somalia. National Book Award-winning writer Robert Stone, writing about Bauman's 2005 novel Voodoo Lounge about a female soldier with HIV during the 1994 occupation of Haiti, said, "The prose in Voodoo Lounge reverberates in the white space around it." Bauman's first two novels are among the very small group of war-based literary fiction produced by Generation X. His third novel, In Hoboken (2008), is a departure from the first two, centered on a group of young musicians in the mid-1990s, and the mental-health facility where one of them works. Reviewing In Hoboken, critic Paul Constant wrote, "Bauman is an incredible writer. This is one of those books -- like Lethem when he's cooking, or Chabon at his most vibrant -- when every line snaps and propels you forward." Christian Bauman's short essays appeared regularly on NPR's All Things Considered between 2003 and 2006. Bauman is the creative director of an advertising agency in New York City. He regularly updates his personal blog, including posts about progress on two new novels.

The subject matter of Bauman's first two novels was drawn from his experiences serving as a soldier in the United States Army. He joined the army in 1991, at age 21, and remained in for four years. He was a member of the small army boat field (Army Waterborne), and served in Somalia in 1992-93 (on an LCM-8), and Haiti in 1994 (on the LSV-1). In both cases, Bauman was among the first American troops in the deployment—within the opening weeks of the Somalia mission, and within the first hour of the Haiti occupation.

Following his honorable discharge in 1995, Bauman spent the next few years writing and playing guitar on the North American folk circuit, both alone and as part of the group Camp Hoboken (which also included folksingers Gregg Cagno and Linda Sharar in its ranks). Christian was frequently an opener for acts including Pete Seeger, Jack Hardy, John Gorka, Odetta, Cheryl Wheeler, and Livingston Taylor, at venues such as Godfrey Daniels, Passim, Eddie's Attic, The Iron Horse, and Freight & Salvage. This time period serves as the basis of Bauman's third novel, In Hoboken.

Bauman wrote both songs and short stories during the 1990s. Some of the songs, including one called "Kismaayo", written in Mogadishu and mailed back to Jack Hardy, who then performed it at The Bottom Line, are in the Smithsonian's Folkways Collection of New York's Fast Folk recordings. None of Bauman's short stories from the time have been published. A few small sections of The Ice Beneath You were written in Somalia during Bauman's deployment there, but the majority was penned in 1999–2000; the novel was purchased by Simon & Schuster in 2001 and published in 2002. In his book What Every Person Should Know About War, author Chris Hedges called The Ice Beneath You "one of the finest books about life in the American army." 
   
On NPR, the majority of Bauman's commentaries for All Things Considered have been about the four years he was a soldier, but he has also written about his origins as a writer, his daughters, and his time as a touring musician.

Personal life
Bauman's has two daughters: Kristina born in 1988 and Fiona born in 1999.

Novels
 In Hoboken (Melville House Publishing, 2008)
 Voodoo Lounge (Simon & Schuster/Touchstone, 2005)
 The Ice Beneath You (Simon & Schuster/Touchstone, 2002)

Other works
 War Is... (Candlewick, 2008); essay titled "Letter to a Young Enlistee"
 Living on the Edge of the World: New Jersey Writers Take On the Garden State (Touchstone, 2007); essay titled "The Commute (Hoboken 1996)"
 Not Like I'm Jealous or Anything: The Jealousy Book (young adult) (Delacorte, 2006); short story written with daughter Kristina Bauman titled "Everyone's Green About Something"
 Bookmark Now: Writing in Unreaderly Times (Basic Books, 2005); essay titled "Not Fade Away"
 Bauman contributed to What Every Person Should Know About War by Chris Hedges (Free Press, 2003)

References

External links
 Official website

1970 births
Living people
21st-century American essayists
21st-century American male writers
21st-century American novelists
American lyricists
American male essayists
American male novelists
Fast Folk artists
North Hunterdon High School alumni
Novelists from New Jersey
Novelists from Pennsylvania
People from Bucks County, Pennsylvania
People from Franklin Township, Hunterdon County, New Jersey
Songwriters from New Jersey
Songwriters from Pennsylvania
United States Army soldiers
Writers from Easton, Pennsylvania